Transport for Wales (TfW;) is a not-for-profit company owned by the Welsh Government and managed at arms length by its appointed board. TfW oversees the Transport for Wales Group (TfW Group) consisting of itself and its subsidiaries: Transport for Wales Rail, the train operator of the Wales & Borders railway franchise; Pullman Rail Limited; and TfW Innovation Services Limited, a joint venture between TfW (51%) and former operator KeolisAmey Wales (49%).

TfW contracted KeolisAmey Wales in 2018 to run using the trading name Transport for Wales Rail Services. Due to a fall in passengers caused by the COVID-19 pandemic, a Welsh-government owned company, Transport for Wales Rail Limited, took over day-to-day operations of the franchise on 7 February 2021.

History 
TfW was established to provide support and expertise to the Welsh Government in connection with transport projects in Wales. In 2017, it procured the new Operator and Development Partner for the Wales & Borders railway franchise under powers delegated to the Welsh government under the Government of Wales Act 2006.

The company introduced the Transport for Wales brand to replace the now defunct Arriva Trains Wales brand on the Wales & Borders franchise from 14 October 2018. The franchise was fully operated by KeolisAmey Wales.

In the Summer 2020 the Welsh Government withdrew the Bus Services (Wales) Bill that they were developing, which would have provided local councils with the statutory power to franchise bus routes in Wales. This was because they aimed, as part of other reasons "to utilise Transport for Wales as the main delivery and procurement body for the bus system, transferring the roles from local authorities, in return for the local authorities becoming part ‘owners’ of TfW".

On 22 October 2020, the Welsh Government announced that the Wales and Borders rail franchise was to transfer operations to a Welsh-government owned rail operator of last resort, due to the COVID-19 pandemic, all staff, operations, and branding was transferred to the new company on 7 February 2021.

On 10 August 2021, TfW announced the acquisition of Cardiff-based engineering service provider Pullman Rail Ltd from Colas Rail. TfW stated this was to ensure their Canton depot "will have the required capacity and resilience to support the introduction of TfWs flagship Metro scheme alongside new rolling stock for the Wales and Borders network."

Transport initiatives

Regional metros 

TfW is responsible for the development of the South Wales, North Wales and Swansea Bay and West Wales Metros. Both are multi-modal systems, integrating the heavy and light rail networks with local bus services, active travel and other modes of transport.

A North-South railway has been suggested to better link North and South Wales.

Fflecsi 

As part of the Welsh Government's Llwybr Newydd strategy. On 18 May 2020, Fflecsi, a demand-responsive transport service was launched in Newport in co-operation between TfW, Newport Bus and Newport City Council. The service has since expanded to multiple principal areas of Wales. Fflecsi is part of TfW's increased investment in alternative transport modes, with further expansion planned across Wales following good progress and popularity of the service in Newport and Cardiff North. In 2021, Fflecsi expanded operations to Blaenau Gwent and Flintshire, although the Newport service was discontinued from 25 September 2022.

References

External links

Transport for Wales at GOV.WALES

Rail transport in Wales
2016 establishments in Wales
Welsh Government
Government-owned companies of Wales
Transport organisations based in the United Kingdom